Sanna Ejaz or Sana Ijaz, is a journalist and human rights activist from Khyber Pakhtunkhwa, Pakistan. She is a leading member of the Pashtun Tahafuz Movement (PTM), as well as a founding member of the Waak Movement, which aims to bring political awareness among Pashtun women. She focuses on advocacy to promote women's role in peacebuilding, reconciliation, and social activism. She was formerly the vice-president of the youth wing of Awami National Party (ANP).

Career and social activism
Sanna worked as an anchor and host at the state-owned Pakistan Television Corporation (PTV) for two and a half years. However, she was fired from her job on 9 May 2018 because of her activism at PTM. In late 2018, she also lost her job at a nongovernmental advocacy organization, Shirkat Gah. Regarding her association with PTM, she said: "I was not doing anything wrong by supporting a peaceful demand for justice, for constitutional rights, and for peace. I will not back down."

On 9 February 2020, just before PTM's public gathering in Loralai, Balochistan to mark the first death anniversary of Arman Loni, security forces arrested Sanna Ejaz, Wranga Loni, Arfa Siddiq, and other female PTM activists as they were on their way to the gathering site. The security forces released them, however, when political activists gathered outside the police station to protest for them.

See also
 Gulalai Ismail
 Bushra Gohar

References

External links
 "The Year of Shrinking Freedoms", article by Rabia Mehmood, South Asia Regional Researcher, Amnesty International, 13 December 2018.

Living people
Pakistani human rights activists
Pakistani humanists
People from Peshawar
Pashtun women
University of Peshawar alumni
Plymouth State University alumni
Pashtun Tahafuz Movement politicians
Awami National Party politicians
Pakistani prisoners and detainees
Pakistani feminists
Women television journalists
Pakistani women journalists
Pakistani television newsreaders and news presenters
Pakistani television talk show hosts
Year of birth missing (living people)